Savitri Katheria is an Indian politician and a member of 17th Legislative Assembly, Uttar Pradesh of India. She represents the ‘Bharthana’ constituency in Etawah district of Uttar Pradesh.

Political career
Savitri Katheria contested Uttar Pradesh Assembly Election as Bharatiya Janata Party candidate and defeated her close contestant Kamlesh Kumar Katheria from Samajwadi Party with a margin of 1,968 votes.

Posts held

References

Uttar Pradesh MLAs 2017–2022
Year of birth missing (living people)
Living people
Bharatiya Janata Party politicians from Uttar Pradesh